Louis Victor Piniella ( usually ; born August 28, 1943) is a former professional baseball player and manager. An outfielder, he played 16 seasons in Major League Baseball (MLB) with the Baltimore Orioles, Cleveland Indians, Kansas City Royals and New York Yankees. During his playing career, he was named AL Rookie of the Year in 1969 and captured two World Series championships with the Yankees (1977, 1978).

Following his playing career, Piniella became a manager for the Yankees (1986–1988), Cincinnati Reds (1990–1992), Seattle Mariners (1993–2002), Tampa Bay Devil Rays (2003–2005), and Chicago Cubs (2007–2010). He won the 1990 World Series championship with the Reds and led the Mariners to four postseason appearances in seven years (including a record 116-win regular season in 2001). He also captured back-to-back division titles (2007–2008) during his time with the Cubs. Piniella was named Manager of the Year three times during his career (1995, 2001, 2008) and finished his managerial career ranked 14th all time on the list of managerial wins.

He was nicknamed "Sweet Lou", both for his swing as a major league hitter and, facetiously, to describe his demeanor as a player and manager.

Early life
Piniella was born in Tampa, Florida.  Though he is often mistaken for being Italian American, Piniella's parents were of Asturian descent, from northwest Spain. He grew up in West Tampa, and played American Legion baseball and PONY League baseball alongside fellow future major league manager Tony La Russa. Piniella attended Jesuit High School in Tampa, where he played several sports and was an All-American in basketball. After graduation in 1961, he attended the University of Tampa for a year, where he was a College Division (today's Division II) All-American in baseball for the Spartans.

Playing career
Piniella was signed by the Cleveland Indians at age 18 as an amateur free agent on June 9, 1962. That fall, he was drafted by the Washington Senators from the Indians in the 1962 first year draft. In August , Piniella was sent to the Baltimore Orioles to complete an earlier trade for Buster Narum, and Piniella played in his first major league game that September with the Orioles at the age of 21. He also played 3 seasons with the Portland Beavers 1966-1968. Prior to the 1966 season, he was traded by the Orioles back to the Indians for Cam Carreon, and made his second major league appearance in September 1968 at age 25 with the Indians.

In the middle part of the decade, Piniella played winter baseball in Nicaragua.

Piniella was selected by the Seattle Pilots in the 1968 expansion draft in October, but was traded after spring training on April 1 to the Kansas City Royals for John Gelnar and Steve Whitaker. 

Piniella played for the Royals for their first five seasons (1969–1973) and was the American League's Rookie of the Year in 1969 and was named to the 1972 All-Star Game. He was the first batter in Royals history; on April 8 of their first season in 1969, he led off the bottom of the first inning against left-hander Tom Hall of the Minnesota Twins. Piniella doubled to left field, then scored on an RBI single by Jerry Adair.

After the 1973 season, Piniella was traded by the Royals with Ken Wright to the New York Yankees for Lindy McDaniel. Baseball author Bill James called the trade the only clinker the Royals made during the 1970s.  He played with the Yankees for 11 seasons, during which the Yankees won five AL East titles (1976–78, 1980, and 1981), four AL pennants (1976–78, and 1981), and two World Series championships (1977–78). In 1975, he missed part of the year with an inner ear infection. From mid-1977 through the end of 1980, he was the Yankees' regular outfielder/DH.

In his career, Piniella made one All-Star team and compiled 1,705 lifetime hits despite not playing full-time for just under half of his career. He received 2 votes for the Hall of Fame as a player in 1990.

Coaching and front office career

New York Yankees

After retiring as a player, Piniella joined the Yankees coaching staff as the hitting coach. He managed the Yankees from 1986 to 1987; promoted to general manager to start the 1988 season, he took over as manager after the firing of Billy Martin on June 23. His initial managerial contract for 1986 was for $200,000. Combining both stints as Yankees manager, he posted 224 wins and 193 losses.

Cincinnati Reds

Hired in November 1989, Piniella managed the Cincinnati Reds from 1990 through 1992. In his first year, the Reds won the World Series in a four-game sweep of the heavily-favored Oakland Athletics, who were the defending champions. His three-year contract totaled over $1 million. Following his third season, he announced in October that he had rejected a contract extension. He finished with a record of 255 wins and 231 losses.

Seattle Mariners
Under a new ownership group, Piniella was introduced as the new manager of the Mariners in November 1992, and led the Seattle Mariners for ten seasons (1993–2002). His wife Anita initially insisted he not take the position; they lived in New Jersey in Allendale, and she thought Seattle was too far away from their family and children, and spring training was in Arizona instead of Florida. His initial contract in Seattle was for $2.5 million over three years, significantly more than his predecessor, Bill Plummer, whose two-year deal totaled $500,000.

On August 18, 1999, he won his 1,000th game (having managed 1,926 in total) in a 5-1 victory over the Toronto Blue Jays. 

Piniella won the AL Manager of the Year Award in 1995, and again in 2001, when he led the Mariners to a record-tying 116 wins. After winning the 2001 AL Division Series, the Mariners dropped the first two games of the AL Championship Series, and Piniella held an angry post-game press conference in which he guaranteed the Mariners would win two out of three games in New York to return the ALCS to Seattle. However, the Yankees closed out the series at Yankee Stadium, and the Mariners would not reach the postseason again until 2022. Following the 2002 season, Piniella requested out of his final year with the Mariners to manage the Tampa Bay Devil Rays. As compensation, the Devil Rays traded outfielder Randy Winn to the Mariners for infield prospect Antonio Perez.

Piniella finished with a record of 840 wins and 711 losses. All four of the Mariners' playoff appearances in team history to that point were under Piniella.  In 2014, Pinella was inducted into the Seattle Mariners Hall of Fame on August 9.

Tampa Bay Devil Rays
Piniella returned to the Tampa area in October 2002, taking over for a team that had just finished at  under Hal McRae. In his first two seasons with the Devil Rays, Piniella was able to improve the team somewhat, and they won a franchise-record 70 games in 2004. This was also the first season in which they did not finish last in their division.

During the 2005 season, Piniella was critical of the Devil Rays' front office for focusing too much on the future and not enough on immediate results, and for not increasing payroll quickly enough to field a competitive team. The Devil Rays started the season with a $30 million payroll, which was the lowest in the major leagues; the Yankees payroll in 2005 was over $208 million. Tensions eventually made Piniella step down as the Devil Rays' manager on September 21. He finished with a record of 200 wins and 285 losses. He had a season remaining on his four-year $13 million contract from October 2002, but agreed to a $2.2 million buyout, in lieu of $4.4 million that he was due for a fourth season. He would have also received $1.25 million in deferred salary from 2003.

Chicago Cubs
On October 16, Piniella agreed to a three-year contract to manage the Chicago Cubs for $10 million with a $5 million option for a fourth year in 2010.

Though Piniella's Cubs won the Central Division in his first two years (2007–2008), and boasted the best record in the NL in 2008, the Cubs were swept in the postseason both years, first by the Arizona Diamondbacks and then the Los Angeles Dodgers in the 2008 NLDS. Piniella was named NL Manager of the Year for 2008.

In 2010, Piniella announced on July 20 his intention to retire as manager of the Cubs at season's end.  However, on August 22, Piniella decided to resign after that day's game, stating that he wanted to care for his ailing 90-year-old mother. He finished with a record of 316 wins and 293 losses.

San Francisco Giants
On February 2, 2011, Piniella was hired by the San Francisco Giants as a special consultant. He did not return to that position after the season.

Return to Cincinnati Reds
On February 5, 2016, Piniella rejoined the Cincinnati Reds as a special consultant.

Managerial record

Broadcasting career
In 1989, Piniella worked as a color analyst for Yankees telecasts on MSG Network. After parting ways with the Devil Rays in 2005, Piniella was an analyst for Fox Sports, first joining Joe Buck and Tim McCarver calling the 2005 American League Championship Series.  He was then an analyst with the network for the 2006 season, and also joined Thom Brennaman and Steve Lyons for the postseason.

During their broadcast of Game 3 of the 2006 American League Championship Series, Piniella was commenting on player Marco Scutaro who had struggled during the regular season but was playing well during the series. He stated that to expect Scutaro to continue playing well would be similar to finding a wallet on Friday and expecting to find another wallet on Saturday and Sunday. Piniella then commented that player Frank Thomas needed to get "en fuego" which is Spanish for "on fire", because he was "frio" meaning "cold". Lyons responded by saying that Piniella was "hablaing  Español" and added, "I still can't find my wallet. I don't understand him, and I don't want to sit close to him now."

Fox fired Lyons for making the above remarks, which they determined to be insensitive. Piniella later defended Lyons saying Lyons was "a man" and that "There isn't a racist bone in his [Lyons'] body. Not one. I've known the guy personally. He was kidding with me, nothing more and nothing less."

On February 22, 2012, it was announced Piniella would join the YES Network as an analyst for Yankees games. He made his YES debut on March 4 during a Yankees-Phillies spring training game. He left the network after the season.

Personal life
Piniella married his wife Anita (Garcia) in 1967, and together they have three children. 

Piniella suffered what was described as a "mini-stroke" in June 2017, but sufficiently recovered to resume his role as senior advisor to baseball operations with the Cincinnati Reds for the 2018 season.

Hall of Fame consideration
Piniella has been a candidate for election to the Baseball Hall of Fame by the Veterans Committee twice, in 2016 and 2018, but has thus far failed to be elected. In 2018 he received 11 of a required 12 votes for the 2019 induction class.

In other media
Piniella made a cameo appearance in the 1994 film Little Big League.

In late 2007, Piniella appeared in a television commercial for Aquafina bottled water in which he parodies his famous June 2, 2007 meltdown at Wrigley Field.

Piniella and Chicago White Sox manager Ozzie Guillén appeared in one commercial to advertise a local car dealership during the first half of the 2008 Crosstown series. The creators of the commercial used their likeness in three other commercials, which featured stunt doubles riding bicycles and jumping rope.

In 2009, Piniella did a commercial for DirecTV and in 2018, commercials in the Seattle area for Sustainable Housing for Ageless Generations (SHAG), formerly Senior Housing Assistance Group, a non-profit senior citizen affordable living organization.

See also

 List of Major League Baseball annual doubles leaders
 List of Major League Baseball managers by wins

References

External links

Lou Piniella at SABR (Baseball BioProject)
Lou Piniella at Baseball Almanac
Lou Piniella at Baseballbiography.com
Sports Illustrated – Lou Piniella through the years (photo gallery)

1943 births
Living people
Aberdeen Pheasants players
American expatriate baseball players in Nicaragua
American expatriate baseball players in Venezuela
American League All-Stars
American people of Spanish descent
American people of Asturian descent
Baltimore Orioles players
Baseball players from Tampa, Florida
Chicago Cubs managers
Cincinnati Reds managers
Cleveland Indians players
Elmira Pioneers players
Jesuit High School (Tampa) alumni
Kansas City Royals players
Major League Baseball broadcasters
Major League Baseball general managers
Major League Baseball hitting coaches
Major League Baseball left fielders
Major League Baseball Rookie of the Year Award winners
Manager of the Year Award winners
New York Yankees announcers
New York Yankees coaches
New York Yankees executives
New York Yankees managers
New York Yankees players
People from Allendale, New Jersey
Peninsula Senators players
Portland Beavers players
Seattle Mariners managers
Selma Cloverleafs players
Tampa Bay Devil Rays managers
Tampa Spartans baseball players
Tiburones de La Guaira players
World Series-winning managers